Claude Lise (born 31 January 1941 in Fort-de-France) is a French politician from Martinique. He is a Doctor, and was first elected to public office on 24 September 1995. 
He is the President of the Assembly of Martinique, which replaced both the  Regional and General Councils of Martinique at the end of 2015.

Lise served as the President of the General Council of Martinique from 1992 to 2011.
He represented Martinique in the French National Assembly from 1988 to 1993 and in the French Senate from 1995 to 2011.

Political positions
 President of the Assembly of Martinique
 Senatorial groups of friendship:
France-Caribbean
France-Quebec
France-Syria
 Former Deputy
Former Assistant of the mayor of Fort-de-France
 Former Member of Parliament on mission near the Secretary with the Overseas
 Member of the Commission of finances, the budgetary control and the economic accounts of the Nation 
 Connected with the Socialist Group

References 

1941 births
Living people
Presidents of the Assembly of Martinique
Senators of Martinique
French Senators of the Fifth Republic
Deputies of the 9th National Assembly of the French Fifth Republic
Presidents of the General Council of Martinique
Martiniquais  physicians
Martinican Progressive Party politicians
Martinican Democratic Rally politicians
People from Fort-de-France